Dixie Chili and Deli, originally Dixie Chili, is a chain of three Cincinnati chili restaurants located in the state of Kentucky. Dixie Chili is famous for their chili, coneys, and sandwiches. Greek immigrant Nicholas Sarakatsannis  founded the first location in 1929 in Newport, Kentucky, just across the Ohio River from the city of Cincinnati. Today the company also has locations in Erlanger and Covington, additionally distributing a canned version of their chili product in supermarkets in the Cincinnati and Kentucky area.

History

Nicholas Sarakatsannis immigrated to the United States from Greece in 1912 at the age of 15 in order to escape hostilities between the Greeks and the Turks.  He landed a series of jobs in restaurants and the food industry, eventually arriving in Cincinnati. In 1928, he began working for Empress Chili, the original Cincinnati-style chili parlor. His first day on the job he made nine gallons of chili.

He soon became convinced he could develop his own recipe and open his own chili parlor. Searching the region on buses between split shifts for a location that would not be in competition with Empress, Sarakatsannis found a location in Newport, Kentucky on Monmouth Street, the city's primary business district. The first Dixie Chili restaurant opened its doors in 1929, the year the Great Depression began in the United States and is still a family-owned company.

See also

 Skyline Chili
 Gold Star Chili
 Camp Washington Chili
 List of delicatessens

References

The History of Dixie Chili
Polly Campbell. Cincinnati Enquirer: Dixie Choices Change Chili Purists' Parlor 18 February 2000

External links
Dixie Chili Official Website

Buildings and structures in Campbell County, Kentucky
Hot dog restaurants in the United States
Regional restaurant chains in the United States
Newport, Kentucky
Restaurants established in 1929
Tourist attractions in Campbell County, Kentucky
Cuisine of Cincinnati
1929 establishments in Kentucky
Delicatessens in the United States